Ustinovo (Üstinäw) is a rural locality (a village) in Ilchigulovsky Selsoviet, Uchalinsky District, Bashkortostan, Russia. The population was 26 as of 2010. There is 1 street.

Geography 
Ustinovo is located 8 km northwest of Uchaly (the district's administrative centre) by road.

References 

Rural localities in Uchalinsky District